The following is a chronological list of the starting pitchers for each World Series game contested in Major League Baseball.

Each pitcher's win–loss record for World Series starts, cumulative through the game in question, is listed when the starting pitcher received a win or loss. The absence of a win or loss indicates a no decision. Wins or losses a pitcher received in relief appearances are not included here.

The leader for World Series starts in a career is Whitey Ford, with 22 between 1950 and 1964, all for the New York Yankees. Ford is the leader both in World Series wins by a starting pitcher, with 10, and World Series losses by a starting pitcher, with eight. Christy Mathewson is the career leader in World Series complete games, with 10 during 1905–1913, all for the New York Giants.

The record for the most innings pitched in a single World Series start is 14, held by Babe Ruth who won an extra innings complete game for the Boston Red Sox in the 1916 World Series. Facing 48 batters, Ruth allowed one run on six hits while walking three and striking out four. Several starting pitchers have been credited with zero innings pitched, by not recording an out, the most recent being Bob Welch for the Los Angeles Dodgers in the 1981 World Series. Welch faced only four batters, allowing three hits and a walk, and was charged with two runs; his team ultimately won the game.

List

1900s

1910s

1920s

1930s

1940s

1950s

1960s

1970s

1980s

1990s

2000s

2010s

2020s

References

External links
 Post-Season Games Directory at Retrosheet

Starting pitchers
World Series starting pitchers